Iblomorpha is a small order of barnacles in the class Thecostraca. There are only two families and about eight described species in Iblomorpha.

Genera
These families, subfamilies, and genera belong to the order Iblomorpha:
 Order Iblomorpha Buckeridge & Newman, 2006
 Family Iblidae Leach, 1825
 Subfamily Iblinae Leach, 1825
 Genus Ibla Leach, 1825
 Subfamily Neoiblinae Buckeridge & Newman, 2006
 Genus Neoibla Buckeridge & Newman, 2006
 Family Idioiblidae Buckeridge & Newman, 2006
 Subfamily Chaetolepadinae Buckeridge & Newman, 2006
 Genus Chaetolepas Studer, 1889
 Genus Chitinolepas Buckeridge & Newman, 2006
 Subfamily Idioiblinae Buckeridge & Newman, 2006
 Genus Idioibla Buckeridge & Newman, 2006

References

Further reading

 

Barnacles